The Golden Crown Literary Society (GCLS) is an American non-profit organization established in February 2004 as a literary and educational organization for the study, discussion, enjoyment, and enhancement of Lesbian literature. In 2020, in order to be inclusive, the GCLS changed the focus from "lesbian" works to reflect the study, discussion, enjoyment and enhancement of literature about "women loving women." Since 2005, the GCLS has presented Golden Crown Literary Awards ("Goldies") in various categories of fiction about lesbians and women loving women at its annual conference. The GCLS mission statement, reformulated in 2020, states that the mission is "to increase the visibility and quality of women loving women themed literature". Largely a volunteer effort, GCLS has one paid managing director, and the membership includes publishers, distributors, authors, editors, reviewers, and readers of fiction about lesbians and women loving women.

History 

In 2004, the GCLS was established, and from 2004 to 2009, informal organizational officers operated in their roles with advisory committees. In 2009, a formal board of directors with an executive director was established, along with bylaws and formal reporting to the members.  The first formal executive director was Patty Schramm from 2009 to 2014. Elizabeth (Liz) Gibson served as executive director 2014–2016, Mary Phillips served 2016–2021. After the departure of Mary Phillips, the tnterim executive director was Ann Roberts until a new organization structure was put in place, and Michele Reynolds took on the role of board president, with Amanda Radley taking up the new role of managing director.

In 2011 (and retroactive to 2007), the GCLS attained federal nonprofit status.

The organization's primary event - both educational and promotional - is the annual conference which was first offered in 2005, where authors, readers, and publishers come together to share their love of literature, publishers, authors, and reading. The conference has been held yearly since 2005 and offers an author educational Track of Master Classes and sessions, a Panel Track of discussions on various topics related to writing, and one or more General Tracks composed of author chats and readings. The GCLS annual conference and organization has experienced success over the years and grown significantly.  In 2019, the GCLS celebrated its 15th year of conferences around the nation. Due to the Pandemic, in 2020 and 2021 the conference was held virtually with a comprehensive online program.

In 2014, the GCLS opened the GCLS Writing Academy, offering educational support and classes to new and upcoming authors of women loving women fiction and creative non-fiction.  GCLS also offers one-on-one mentoring for authors nearing the publication stage of a book as well as "GCLS Presents..." - a new video series of author interviews and presentations.

In addition to the mission of the organization, the GCLS has participated in charitable functions. In response to Hurricane Katrina, which took place just after the organization's first conference in New Orleans, members of the organization raised thousands of dollars in direct aid to lesbians affected by the disaster. Books and other materials have often been donated to charities (such as GLBT libraries). Each year, scholarships are offered to readers and writers for conference attendance, and other charitable activities are also underway.

Conferences 
In 2005, the organization held the first conference in New Orleans where lesbian writers, teachers, and speakers joined readers, fans, publishers, and others to document lesbian literary history, award "Goldies" to top finalists in the book awards categories, and share needed information about writing craft and technique in multiple workshops. Fundraising efforts began in 2006 to support scholarships, a Mentoring Program was added in 2007, and in 2008, seventeen scholarships were awarded to enable more individuals to attend.

Conference attendees cite the event as a crucial social, educational and professional link, important in maintaining a strong lesbian literary field. Since 2005, in addition to a variety of genre category awards given to specific books, the society has awarded a "Trailblazer Award" to a lesbian writer for lifetime achievement in recognition of the contributions she has made to the field of lesbian literature. Since that time, the Lee Lynch Classic Book Award was added in 2012, along with additional genre categories, such as Young Adult, Historical, Poetry, Anthologies, and Erotic Fiction. Awards for outstanding cover and the Ann Bannon Popular Choice are also now included.

Conferences, both past and future:

2024 - Orlando, FL.
2023 - Denver, CO.
2022 - Albuquerque, NM. Trailblazer Award: Elana Dykewomon; Keynote: Sheree Greer
2021 - Virtual Conference: Virtually Everywhere #2 (Pandemic). Trailblazer Award: Pat Parker; Keynote: Emma Donoghue; Special Speaker: S. Renée Bess; 
2020 - Virtual Conference: Virtually Everywhere #1 (Pandemic). Trailblazer Award: Barbara Wilson; Keynote: Radclyffe; Special Speaker: Nicole Conn; 
2019 - Pittsburgh, PA. Trailblazer Award: Sandra Scoppettone; Keynote: Malinda Lo; Special Speaker: Cindy Rizzo 
2018 - Las Vegas, NV. Trailblazer Award: Dorothy Allison; Keynote: Lucy Jane Bledsoe; Special Speaker: Rachel Gold
2017 - Chicago, IL. Trailblazer Award: Lillian Faderman; Keynote: Leslea Newman;  Special Speaker Penny Mickelbury
2016 - Alexandria, VA / Washington DC. Trailblazer Award: Jewelle Gomez; Keynote: Fay Jacobs;  Special Speaker Rachel Spangler
2015 - New Orleans, Louisiana. Trailblazer Award: Joan Nestle; Keynote: Dorothy Allison;  Special Speaker Ali Vali
2014 - Portland, Oregon. Trailblazer Award: Judy Grahn; Keynote: Lori L. Lake; Special Speaker: Ann Bannon
2013 - Dallas, Texas. Trailblazer Award: Marijane Meaker; Keynote: Georgia Beers
2012 - Minneapolis, Minnesota. Trailblazer Award: Marianne K. Martin; Keynote: Jewelle Gomez
2011 - Orlando, FL. Trailblazer Award: Karin Kallmaker; Keynote: KG MacGregor
2010 - Orlando, FL. Trailblazer Award: Ellen Hart; Keynote: Lee Lynch
2009 - Orlando, FL. Trailblazer Award: Lee Lynch; Keynote: J.M. Redmann
2008 - Phoenix, Arizona. Trailblazer Award: Katherine V. Forrest; Keynote: Katherine V. Forrest
2007 - Atlanta, Georgia. Trailblazer Award: Jane Rule; Keynote: Ellen Hart
2006 - Atlanta, Georgia. Trailblazer Award: Sarah Aldridge; Keynote: Ann Bannon
2005 - New Orleans. Trailblazer Award: Ann Bannon; Keynote: Karin Kallmaker

GCLS "Goldie" Awards 

GCLS promotes women loving women literature through the Goldie awards, a yearly awards program with the awards bestowed at the annual conference. Since their inception, the awards categories have expanded from four categories in 2005 to fourteen categories in 2016 plus five special awards. Anywhere from two to ten finalists can be shortlisted in each of the categories (depending on number of submissions) with a maximum of three equal winners named in each category.

In recent years, more than 300 titles from more than three dozen publishers (such as Alyson, Bedazzled Ink, Bella Books, Blue Feather, Bold Strokes Books, Carroll & Graf Publishers, Copper Canyon Press, Farrar Straus Giroux, Flashpoint Publications, Haworth Press, Intaglio, Launch Point Press, Sapphire Books, Spinsters Ink, St. Martin's Press and various university presses) have been nominated for consideration. 

In 2008, author Victor J. Banis became the first male writer to be shortlisted for a Goldie, though he did not win. At the 2010 Awards in Atlanta, author Geonn Cannon became the first male writer to win a Goldie for a novel featuring lesbian characters.

In 2015, Jacob Anderson-Minshall became the first openly transgender author to win a Goldie award from the Golden Crown Literary Society. He shared the award for best creative non-fiction book with Diane Anderson-Minshall for Queerly Beloved: A Love Story Across Genders.

2021 
The 2021 awards ceremony was held July 31, 2021.

References

External links 
 Golden Crown Literary Society Official Page
 Golden Crown Literary Society at Facebook
 Women with Pride Book Club, GCLS Texas/SW Regional Group
 Portland Lesbian Writers Group, GCLS Pacific NW Regional Group

Lesbian fiction
LGBT literary awards
LGBT literature in the United States
Organizations established in 2004
2004 establishments in the United States